Wes Anderson is an American film director and writer.

Major Awards

Academy Awards

British Academy Film Awards

Golden Globe Awards

Independent Spirit Award

Guild Awards

Directors Guild of America

Producers Guild of America

Writers Guild of America

Location Managers Guild Awards

Film Critics Awards

Broadcast Film Critics Association

Central Ohio Film Critics Association

Chicago Film Critics Association Award

Dallas-Fort Worth Film Critics Association

Denver Film Critics Society

Detroit Film Critics Society

Dublin Film Critics' Circle

Florida Film Critics Circle

Georgia Film Critics Association

Houston Film Critics Society

London Film Critics' Awards

Los Angeles Film Critics Association

National Board of Review

National Society of Film Critics

New York Film Critics Circle

Oklahoma Film Critics Circle

Online Film Critics Society

Phoenix Film Critics Society

San Diego Film Critics Society

San Francisco Film Critics Circle

Southeastern Film Critics Association

St. Louis Gateway Film Critics Association

Toronto Film Critics Association

Vancouver Film Critics Circle

Washington D.C. Film Critics Association

Film Festival Awards

Cannes Film Festival

Berlin International Film Festival

Gijón International Film Festival

SXSW Film Festival Audience Awards

Venice International Film Festival

Miscellaneous Awards

Alliance of Women Film Journalists

Annie Award

Bodil Award

David di Donatello

DVD Premiere Award

Lone Star Film and Television Award

MTV Movie Award

Satellite Award

References 

Anderson, Wes